Greek Revival was an architectural style popular in the United States and Canada from about 1800 to 1860. Marcus Whiffen states that the "first building in the United States to incorporate a Greek order was the Bank of Pennsylvania in Philadelphia, designed by Benjamin Henry Latrobe in 1798".  Talbot Hamlin says that "The period called 'Greek Revival,' extending roughly from 1820 to 1860."

The style was employed in ecclesiastical, institutional, and residential buildings. Virtually all the buildings in the style are characterized by the use of columns, usually from the Greek orders, "bilateral symmetry is the rule," the buildings were block (that is, "temple") shaped, with a low pitched or flat roof. Arches were not employed because "the arch had no place in Greek temple architecture."

Several factors led to the style's popularity in the United States, two of them wars. The War of 1812 between the United States and Great Britain led the former colonials in America to wish to disassociate themselves from things British, such as the previously popular Adam style, while the Greek War of Independence, begun in 1821, helped make things Greek admired and emulated.

References

Greek Revival architecture
Architectural styles
Revival architectural styles
 
Neoclassical movements
House styles
North American architecture